Le Nouveau Magazine Littéraire, formerly Le Magazine Littéraire, is a French monthly magazine about literature. It is published by Sophia Publications. The headquarters is in Paris. It is available in print as well as online on Cairn.info.

In 2014, it had a circulation of 20,300 copies. The February 2015 issue was edited by author Pierre Assouline.  In October 2020, Claude Perdriel, owner of Sophia Publications, sold Le Nouveau Magazine Littéraire to Jean-Jacques Augier and Stéphane Chabenat.

References

External links
 Official website

1966 establishments in France
French-language magazines
Literary magazines published in France
Magazines established in 1966
Monthly magazines published in France
Magazines published in Paris